Mendota Heights is a city in Dakota County, Minnesota, United States. It is a first ring southern suburb of the Twin Cities. The population was 11,744 at the 2020 census.

Geography

Interstate Highway 35E, Interstate Highway 494 and Minnesota Highways 55 and 62 are four of the main routes near the town.

Demographics

2010 census
As of the census of 2010, there were 11,071 people, 4,378 households, and 3,204 families living in the city. The racial makeup of the city was 93.8% White, 1.5% African American, 0.2% Native American, 2.2% Asian, 0.6% from other races, and 1.8% from two or more races. Hispanic or Latino of any race were 2.9% of the population.

There were 4,378 households, of which 29.1% had children under the age of 18 living with them, 64.4% were married couples living together, 6.4% had a female householder with no husband present, 2.3% had a male householder with no wife present, and 26.8% were non-families. 22.3% of all households were made up of individuals, and 10.8% had someone living alone who was 65 years of age or older. The average household size was 2.51 and the average family size was 2.96.

The median age in the city was 47.5 years. 22.6% of residents were under the age of 18; 6.4% were between the ages of 18 and 24; 16.9% were from 25 to 44; 36.3% were from 45 to 64; and 17.7% were 65 years of age or older. The gender makeup of the city was 48.3% male and 51.7% female.

2000 census
At the 2000 census, there were 11,434 people, 4,178 households and 3,237 families living in the town. The racial makeup of the town was 95.66% White, 0.88% African American, 0.17% Native American, 1.78% Asian, 0.46% from other races, and 1.04% from two or more races. Hispanic or Latino of any race were 1.78% of the population.

There were 4,178 households, of which 36.3% had children under the age of 18 living with them, 69.5% were married couples living together, 6.1% had a female householder with no husband present, and 22.5% were non-families. 18.9% of all households were made up of individuals, and 8.4% had someone living alone who was 65 years of age or older. The average household size was 2.72 and the average family size was 3.14.

Age distribution was 27.6% under the age of 18, 5.8% from 18 to 24, 22.7% from 25 to 44, 29.5% from 45 to 64, and 14.5% who were 65 years of age or older. The median age was 42 years. For every 100 females, there were 92.7 males. For every 100 females age 18 and over, there were 89.9 males.

The median income for a household in the town was $97,701 and the median income for a family was $103,204. Males had a median income of $61,095 versus $41,208 for females; the per capita income was $49,589. About 1.3% of families and 1.9% of the population were below the poverty line, including 0.9% of those under age 18 and 2.0% of those age 65 or over.

Local government and politics
The City was incorporated in 1956.  It operates as a Plan A form of government under Minnesota law, with an elected Mayor and four members of a City Council.  The term of office for the Mayor is two years.  The City Councilors are elected for four year, staggered terms.

Economy
Headquartered in Mendota Heights
Patterson Companies
Bellarcor, Esslinger & Co. 
Mayflower Distributing, Inc.

Education
Mendota Elementary (Public, K-4)
Somerset Elementary (Public, K-4)
Friendly Hills Middle School (Public, 5-8) 
Two Rivers High School  (Public, 9-12)
Convent of the Visitation (Private, Boys K-5. Girls K–12)
Saint Thomas Academy (Private, Boys 6-12)

Notable people 
Matt Birk, Minnesota Vikings and Baltimore Ravens center
David Hicks (born 1988), basketball player for Ironi Nahariya of the Israeli Basketball Premier League
Becky Holder, 2008 Summer Olympic Games equestrian
Bert McKasy (1945–2019), Minnesota state legislator, lawyer, and businessman
Justin Morneau, Minnesota Twins player and 2006 American League MVP
T.J. Oshie, hockey player, Washington Capitals forward
Robert and Kathleen Ridder, local philanthropists and businesspeople

References

External links
 City of Mendota Heights website

Cities in Minnesota
Cities in Dakota County, Minnesota
Dakota toponyms
Minnesota populated places on the Mississippi River